Clover Bar-Fort Saskatchewan was a provincial electoral district in Alberta, Canada mandated to return a single member to the Legislative Assembly of Alberta using the first-past-the-post method of voting from 1993 to 2001.

The electoral district was named for the City of Fort Saskatchewan and the Clover Bar community.

History
The Clover Bar-Fort Saskatchewan electoral district was formed in the 1993 electoral boundary re-distribution from the dissolved Clover Bar electoral district.

The Clover Bar-Fort Saskatchewan electoral district was dissolved following the 2003 electoral boundary re-distribution and merged with portions of Redwater and Vegreville-Viking to form Fort Saskatchewan-Vegreville.

Members of the Legislative Assembly (MLAs)

Election results

1993 general election

1997 general election

2001 general election

See also
List of Alberta provincial electoral districts
Fort Saskatchewan, a city in Alberta

References

External links
Elections Alberta
The Legislative Assembly of Alberta

Former provincial electoral districts of Alberta